The Little Snob is a 1928 silent comedy film from Warner Bros. It was released with a synchronized musical score and sound effects using the Vitaphone sound-on-disc process, however there is no spoken dialogue.

Cast
May McAvoy as May Banks
Robert Frazer as Jim Nolan
Alec B. Francis as Colonel Banks
Virginia Lee Corbin as Jane
Frances Lee as Alice
John Miljan as Walt Keene

Preservation status
An incomplete version of this film is preserved at the UCLA Film & Television Archive.

References

External links

1928 films
Films directed by John G. Adolfi
Warner Bros. films
Lost American films
1928 comedy films
American silent feature films
American black-and-white films
Silent American comedy films
Films with screenplays by Robert Lord (screenwriter)
1928 lost films
Lost comedy films
1920s American films